Colliers Wood is a London Underground station in South London. It is located at the corner of Merton High Street (A24) and Christchurch Road. The station is in Travelcard Zone 3.

History
The station was opened on 13 September 1926 as part of the Morden extension of the City & South London Railway south from Clapham Common.

Along with the other stations on the Morden extension, the building was designed by architect Charles Holden. They were Holden's first major project for the Underground. He was selected by Frank Pick, general manager of the Underground Electric Railways Company of London (UERL), to design the stations after he was dissatisfied with designs produced by the UERL's own architect, Stanley Heaps. Built with a shop to each side, the modernist design takes the form of a double-height three-sided box clad in white Portland stone with a three-part glazed screen on the front façade divided by columns of which the capitals are three-dimensional versions of the Underground roundel. The central panel of the screen contains a large version of the roundel. The station is a Grade II listed building.

The station is close to Merton Bus garage which opened in 1913. The public house across the road is named "The Charles Holden" in honour of the station's architect.

Connections
London Bus routes 57, 131, 152, 200, 219, 470 and night route N155 serves the station.

Gallery

Notes and references

Notes

References

External links

London Transport Museum Photographic Archive

Northern line stations
Tube stations in the London Borough of Merton
Former City and South London Railway stations
Railway stations in Great Britain opened in 1926
Charles Holden railway stations
Art Deco architecture in London
Grade II listed buildings in the London Borough of Merton
London Underground Night Tube stations
Art Deco railway stations